Madhuca microphylla is a species of flowering plant in the family Sapotaceae. It is endemic to Sri Lanka, where it has been found in only two locations.

References

Endemic flora of Sri Lanka
microphylla
Endangered plants
Taxonomy articles created by Polbot